Svetlana Kuznetsova was the defending champion and successfully defended her title, defeating Daria Gavrilova in the final, 6–2, 6–1.

By claiming the title, Kuznetsova became the final qualifier for the 2016 WTA Finals, overtaking Johanna Konta on the race list.

Seeds
The top four seeds received a bye into the second round.

Draw

Finals

Top half

Bottom half

Qualifying

Seeds

Qualifiers

Lucky losers

Draw

First qualifier

Second qualifier

Third qualifier

Fourth qualifier

References
 Main draw
 Qualifying draw

2016 WTA Tour
2016 Women's Singles